Allexivirus is a genus of viruses in the order Tymovirales, in the family Alphaflexiviridae. Shallot, onion, and garlic serve as natural hosts. There are 13 species in this genus, seven of which are assigned to a subgenus. Diseases associated with this genus include: mosaic and ringspot symptoms.

Taxonomy
The following species are assigned to the genus:

 Subgenus: Acarallexivirus
 Garlic virus A
 Garlic virus B
 Garlic virus C
 Garlic virus D
 Garlic virus E
 Garlic virus X
 Shallot virus X
 Species not assigned to a subgenus:
 Alfalfa virus S
 Arachis pintoi virus
 Blackberry virus E
 Garlic mite-borne filamentous virus
 Senna yellow mosaic virus
 Vanilla latent virus

Structure
Viruses in Allexivirus are non-enveloped, with flexuous and filamentous geometries. The diameter is around 12 nm, with a length of 800 nm. Genomes are linear, around 9kb in length. The genome codes for 6 proteins.

Life cycle
Viral replication is cytoplasmic. Entry into the host cell is achieved by penetration into the host cell. Replication follows the positive stranded RNA virus replication model. Positive stranded RNA virus transcription is the method of transcription. The virus exits the host cell by tripartite non-tubule guided viral movement. Shallot, onion, and garlic serve as the natural host. The virus is transmitted via a vector (mite). Transmission routes are vector and mechanical.

References

External links

 Viralzone: Allexivirus
 ICTV

Alphaflexiviridae
Virus genera